, the wandering tone, or the ninth tone, is a reciting tone in Gregorian chant.

The chant example here is not identified as the tonus peregrinus in the Liber usualis (see LU, pp. 760–761), although it is in Aeolian mode. For the tonus peregrinus in its customary usage for Psalm 113, see LU p. 160.

Characteristics
As a reciting tone the  does not fit in any of the original eight church modes, because a verse recited in this tone has a different tenor note in the first half of the verse from the second half of the verse. It is this diversion from a single recitation note which gives the name , literally "wanders".

Also usually the last note of a  melodic formula is a perfect fifth below the first tenor note.

History
In Gregorian chant the  existed before the modal system was expanded beyond the eighth mode. Later the ninth tone became associated with the ninth mode, or Aeolian mode, which, in a more modern understanding of harmony, can be equalled with a standard minor mode.

The  is an exceptional reciting tone in Gregorian chant: there it was most clearly associated with Psalm 113 (in the Vulgate numbering), traditionally sung in vespers.

Musical settings
 variants appear in:
 "Suscepit Israel" from the Magnificat in D major by Johann Sebastian Bach
 Requiem by Wolfgang Amadeus Mozart (used in the Introit)
Miserere Mei, Deus by Gregorio Allegri
 Sonata No. 4, Op. 98, by Josef Rheinberger (harmonized version is used as the second theme in the opening movement)

References
Notes

Sources
 Mattias Lundberg. Tonus Peregrinus: The History of a Psalm-tone and its use in Polyphonic Music, Ashgate Publishing, 2012,  
 Mark L. Russakoff. Joseph Gabriel Rheinberger, Works for Organ, Vol. 1, Naxos, 2017

External links
 "Meine Seele erhebet den Herren: Das Magnificat" ("The German Magnificat") at 

Musical terminology
Melody types
Psalm settings
Magnificat settings